State Road 420 (NM 420) is a state highway in the US state of New Mexico. NM 420's western terminus is at NM 102 east-northeast of Mosquero, and the eastern terminus is at NM 402 south of Amistad.

Major intersections

See also

References

420
Transportation in Harding County, New Mexico
Transportation in Union County, New Mexico